David Epstein may refer to:

 David Epstein (conductor) (1931–2002), composer, conductor and music scientist at MIT
 David B. A. Epstein (born 1937), British mathematician
 David Epstein (journalist), American science writer
 David Epstein (Australia) (born 1963), Australian public affairs specialist
 David Epstein (gangster), former member of Epstein–Wolmark divorce-gang
 David G. Epstein, professor at the University of Richmond School of Law and bankruptcy expert

See also 
 David Eppstein (born 1963), American mathematician and professor of computer science